John Boys (c. 1535 – 1612), of St. Gregory's, Canterbury, the Middle Temple, London and Betteshanger, Kent, was an English politician and 'Kent's leading lawyer'.

Career
He was a Member of Parliament (MP) for Sandwich in 1572, Midhurst in 1593, and Canterbury in 1597, 1601 and 1604.

References

1535 births
1612 deaths
People from Canterbury
Politicians from Kent
English MPs 1572–1583
English MPs 1593
English MPs 1597–1598
English MPs 1601
English MPs 1604–1611
People from Betteshanger